Leyla Begnyazovna Akhmerova (born 1957) is a field hockey player and Olympic medalist. Competing for the Soviet Union, she won a bronze medal at the 1980 Summer Olympics in Moscow.

References

External links

1957 births
Living people
Olympic field hockey players of the Soviet Union
Soviet female field hockey players
Field hockey players at the 1980 Summer Olympics
Olympic bronze medalists for the Soviet Union
Olympic medalists in field hockey
Medalists at the 1980 Summer Olympics